Mahendrapala I (885–910) was a ruler of  Pratihara dynasty, the son of Mihir Bhoja I and queen Candra-Bhatta-Rika-Devi. He was also mentioned on various inscriptions in Kathiawar, Punjab and Madhya Pradesh by  names Mahindrapala, Mahendrayudha, Mahisapaladeva, and also Nirbhayaraja and Nirbhayanarendra in the plays of Rajasekhara.

Reign
Inscriptions discovered at Ramgaya, opposite the Gadadhar temple at Gaya, at Guneria in the southern part of the Gaya district, at Itkhori in the Hazaribagh district of Bihar, describe his reign.

Earlier, it was thought that the greater part of Magadha up to even northern Bengal had come under the suzerainty of the monarch Mahendrapala I. However, that theory has been debunked due to the discovery of a Pala king named Mahendrapala, whose inscriptions were mistakenly attributed to his Gurjara namesake. 

In north his authority was extended up to the foot of the Himalayas. Gwalior was also under his control as the Siyadoni inscription mentions him the ruling sovereign in 903 and 907 A.D.. Thus, he retained the empire transmitted to him by his father Mihir Bhoja and also added some part of Bengal by defeating Palas. He also repulsed a Muslim invasion either by the Samanids or the Saffarids.

References

9th-century Indian monarchs
910 deaths
Pratihara empire